Speculative fiction fandom can refer to:
Fantasy fandom
Science fiction fandom